"Get Your Love Right" is a song by Australian musician Jon English. The song was released in May 1979 as the first single from his first compilation album, English History.

Track listing
 Australian 7" Single (Mercury - 6037 121)
Side A "Get Your Love Right"	
Side B "He Could Have Been a Dancer"

Charts

References

Jon English songs
1979 songs
1979 singles
Polydor Records singles